Interval is a 1973 romantic drama film starring Merle Oberon in her final performance. Oberon also produced the movie, and fell in love with her co-star in it, Robert Wolders, divorcing her husband to marry Wolders in 1975.

Plot
Serena Moore has been everywhere and is trying to put her past behind her. She finds refuge in Mexico where, without intending to, falls in love with a much younger painter Chris.

Cast
Merle Oberon ... Serena Moore
Robert Wolders ... Chris
Claudio Brook ... Armando Vertiz
Russ Conway ... Fraser
Britt Leach ... Leonard
Peter von Zerneck ... Broch
Anel ... Jackie

See also
 List of American films of 1973

References

External links

1973 films
Films directed by Daniel Mann
1973 romantic drama films
American romantic drama films
Embassy Pictures films
1970s English-language films
1970s American films